The 2012 Pan American Fencing Championships were held in Cancún, Mexico from 15 to 20 June.

Medal summary

Men's events

Women's events

Medal table

References

2012
Pan American Fencing Championships
International fencing competitions hosted by Mexico
2012 in Mexican sports